Steve Schets (born 20 April 1984) is a Belgian former professional road and track cyclist. On April 27, 2013, he crashed and broke his elbow. This caused him to decide to retire from professional cycling.

Major results

Road

2004
 1st GP Stad Vilvoorde
 3rd Brussels–Zepperen
2005
 1st Stage 4 Tour de Berlin
 1st Stage 4 Ronde van Antwerpen
 2nd Brussels–Zepperen
 3rd Beverbeek Classic
2006
 1st Stage 1 Tour de Berlin
2009
 10th Omloop van het Houtland
2010
 5th Beverbeek Classic
2011
 1st Handzame Classic
 3rd Dorpenomloop Rucphen
 6th Nationale Sluitingprijs
 10th GP Impanis-Van Petegem
2012
 3rd Grand Prix de la ville de Nogent-sur-Oise
 6th Dorpenomloop Rucphen
 8th Arno Wallaard Memorial

Track

2003
 UIV Cup U23
1st Ghent (with Kenny De Ketele)
2nd Amsterdam (with Kenny De Ketele)
2nd Munich (with Kenny De Ketele)
2004
 1st  Points race, National Track Championships
 2nd Overall UIV Cup U23 (with Kenny De Ketele)
1st Munich
2nd Bremen
2nd Berlin
3rd Copenhagen
2005
 1st  Madison, National Track Championships (with Kenny De Ketele)
 2nd  Madison, UEC European Under-23 Championships (with Kenny De Ketele)
 2005–06 UCI World Cup
3rd  Madison, Moscow (with Kenny De Ketele)
2006
 1st  Madison, UEC European Under-23 Championships (with Kenny De Ketele)
 National Track Championships
1st  Scratch
1st  Team pursuit (with Kenny De Ketele, Ingmar De Poortere and Tim Mertens)
2007
 2005–06 UCI World Cup
2nd  Madison, Los Angeles (with Kenny De Ketele)
2010
 3rd  Madison, UCI World Championships (with Ingmar De Poortere)

References

External links

1984 births
Living people
Belgian male cyclists
Belgian track cyclists
People from Ninove
Cyclists from East Flanders